Kaczkowo may refer to the following places:
Kaczkowo, Greater Poland Voivodeship (west-central Poland)
Kaczkowo, Inowrocław County in Kuyavian-Pomeranian Voivodeship (north-central Poland)
Kaczkowo, Żnin County in Kuyavian-Pomeranian Voivodeship (north-central Poland)
Kaczkowo, Pomeranian Voivodeship (north Poland)